Anolis dominicensis is a species of lizard in the family Dactyloidae. The species is found in Hispaniola.

References

Anoles
Reptiles described in 1862
Reptiles of Haiti
Reptiles of the Dominican Republic
Taxa named by Johannes Theodor Reinhardt
Taxa named by Christian Frederik Lütken